Sir Robert Hugh Kirk Marett,  (1907–1981) was a British writer, businessman, civil servant, and diplomat. He was the Consul-General of the United Kingdom to Boston from 1955 to 1958, and the British Ambassador to Peru from 1963 to 1967.

Selected works

References

External links
 

1907 births
1981 deaths
British writers
British civil servants
British diplomats
Knights Commander of the Order of St Michael and St George
Officers of the Order of the British Empire
Fellows of the Royal Anthropological Institute of Great Britain and Ireland